Birgid (also known as Birked, Birguid, Birkit, Birqed, Kajjara, Murgi, Murgi Birked) is an extinct Nubian language that was spoken in western Sudan, north of the city of Nyala in Darfur. Canadian linguist Thelwall mentions his last contact with elderly speakers of Birgid in 1972.

References

Robin A. Thelwall (1977) 'Birgid vocabulary list and its links with Daju' in Ganslmayr, H. & H. Jungraithmayr (Ed), Gedenkschrift für Gustav Nachtigall 1874-1974, Bremen: Übersee-Museum., pp. 197–210

External links
 Birgid basic lexicon at the Global Lexicostatistical Database

Nubian languages
Languages of Sudan